Marrs Township is one of ten townships in Posey County, Indiana. As of the 2000 census, its population was 4,868.

History
Marrs Township was organized in 1817. The township was named for Samuel R. Marrs, a pioneer settler and afterward county commissioner.

Adjacent Townships
 Indiana
 Posey County
 Black Township (West)
 Lynn Township (Single Point - Northwest)
 Robinson Township (North)
 Vanderburgh County
 German Township (Single Point - Northeast)
 Perry Township (East)
 Kentucky
 Henderson County
 Corydon District (South)

Unincorporated Places
Caborn
Heusler
Marrs Center
Philip Station
St. Philip
West Franklin

References

External links
 Indiana Township Association
 United Township Association of Indiana

Townships in Posey County, Indiana
Townships in Indiana